The 2022–23 season is the 124th season in the existence of A.C. Milan and the club's 89th  season in the top flight of Italian football. In addition to the domestic league, Milan are participating in this season's editions of the Coppa Italia, Supercoppa Italiana and UEFA Champions League.

Players

Squad information

.

Transfers

Summer window
Deals officialised beforehand were effective starting from 1 July 2022.

In

Loan in

Loan returns

Total spending: 48.9M

Out

Loans ended

Loans out

Total income: €13.05M

Winter window
Deals officialised beforehand will be effective starting from 2 January 2023.

In

Loan returns

Total spending:  0.47M

Out

Total income

Loans out

Pre-season and friendlies

Competitions

Overall record

Serie A

League table

Results summary

Results by round

Matches
The league fixtures were announced on 24 June 2022.

Coppa Italia

Supercoppa Italiana

UEFA Champions League

Group stage 

The draw for the group stage was held on 25 August 2022.

Knockout phase

Round of 16
The draw for the round of 16 was held on 7 November 2022.

Quarter-finals
The draw for the quarter-finals was held on 17 March 2023.

Statistics

Appearances and goals

|-
! colspan=14 style=background:#dcdcdc; text-align:center| Goalkeepers

|-
! colspan=14 style=background:#dcdcdc; text-align:center| Defenders

|-
! colspan=14 style=background:#dcdcdc; text-align:center| Midfielders

          
|-
! colspan=14 style=background:#dcdcdc; text-align:center| Forwards

|-
! colspan=14 style=background:#dcdcdc; text-align:center| Players transferred out during the season

|-

Goalscorers

Assists

Clean sheets

Disciplinary record

References

A.C. Milan seasons
Milan
Milan